Aam Ganv is a village in Badaun Tehsil and Budaun district, Uttar Pradesh, India.  Aam Ganv village is administrated by Gram panchayat who is elected by the residents of that village. Aam Ganv is 8 kilometers away from Badaun City. The total geographical area of the village is 536.58 hectares. There are 398 houses in Aam Ganv village.

References

Villages in Budaun district